The SEAT Alhambra is a seven-seater minivan that was built from 1996 to 2020. It was manufactured under the SEAT brand from June 1996 onwards at the Volkswagen Group's AutoEuropa plant in Palmela, Portugal. It shares the same platform with the Volkswagen Sharan, and the first generation was also related to the Ford Galaxy. The vehicle is named after the Alhambra of Granada, a famous monument in Spain. It is considered in the motor industry to be a large multi-purpose vehicle (MPV).

First generation (Typ 7M; 1996)

A prototype of the first generation SEAT Alhambra was presented at the 1995 Geneva Salon International de l'Auto. The following year the production Alhambra was launched at the same motor show and went on sale in June. The Alhambra shares most of its components and design with the VW Sharan Mk1 and Ford Galaxy Mk1. However, the Alhambra has more options fitted for a given price range. The Alhambra has seven seats—the five rear seats can be folded down or unclipped and removed completely. When removed the seats leave a flat-floored load space, a unique feature for SEAT vehicles at that time. The load volume varies, from 256l with seven seats, to 852l with five seats, and 2610l with only the two front seats fitted.

The Alhambra was essentially unchanged from 1996 to 2010 but a major restyling in the year 2000 reflected the new SEAT image. Even so, the Alhambra remained faithful to the original design produced under the Volkswagen Group and Ford technology sharing agreement. When Volkswagen and Ford lost market share to other manufacture's MPVs, including the Toyota Previa and Mitsubishi Space Wagon, they changed the design of their versions.

The Alhambra, Sharan, and Galaxy were built on the same production line at the joint venture AutoEuropa plant in Palmela, Portugal, and were essentially the same but with different engine options and interiors. Ford has now withdrawn from the collaboration, and the Galaxy Mk III and the S-Max (a seven-seater based on the Mondeo Mk IV platform) are built in Genk, Belgium, alongside the Mondeo. The AutoEuropa plant did produce the VW Scirocco III from 2008 to 2017.

Introduced in 2009, the SEAT Alhambra Ecomotive is fitted with the 2.0 TDI  engine producing 159 g/km CO2 emissions.

Awards
'Monovolume do Ano' award in 1997, in Portugal

Engines
Petrol
1.8L I4  20V Turbo
2.0L I4 
2.8L VR6  24V
Diesel
1.9L I4  TDI
1.9L I4  TDI
1.9L I4  TDI
1.9L I4  TDI
1.9L I4  TDI
2.0L I4  TDI

Second generation (Typ 7N; 2010)

The second generation SEAT Alhambra went on sale in October 2010. Like the new Sharan, access to the middle row of seats is via sliding doors.

In February 2013 SEAT presented the Alhambra four-wheel-drive version featuring a permanent all wheel drive combined with the 2.0 TDI  diesel engine and a manual six-speed gearbox.

In March 2020 SEAT announced production of the Alhambra would end that month.

Safety

Euro NCAP

2010
In 2010, the safety of the second generation SEAT Alhambra was assessed under the Euro NCAP scheme; it achieved a 5-star overall rating:

2019
The Alhambra in its standard European configuration received 4 stars from Euro NCAP in 2019.

Awards
 ‘Auto Trophy’ 2010 for the imported MPV category, by the German car magazine Autozeitung
 ‘Best imported MPV’ in 2011, by the readers of the German car magazine Auto, Motor und Sport
 ‘Best MPV on the market’ award in 2011, by the British magazine What Car?
 ‘Best MPV’ in 2011, at the UK Fleet World Honours
 ‘Best MPV’ in 2011, by the British motoring magazine Diesel Car
 ‘MPV of the Year’ award in 2011, by panel members of the Portuguese ‘Car of the Year – Crystal Steering Wheel Trophy’
 ‘Best MPV’ in 2011, at the second edition of the Ecomotor Awards, organised by the Spanish newspaper El Economista
 ‘Best MPV on the market’ award in 2012, by the British magazine What Car?
 ‘Best MPV on the market’ award in 2013, by the British magazine What Car?

Engines
Petrol
1.4 L 110 kW (150 hp) TSI
2.0 L 147 kW (200 hp) TSI
Diesel
2.0 L 103 kW (140 hp) TDI
2.0 L 130 kW (177 hp) TDI
2.0 L 85 kW (114 hp) TDI

Sales 
Since 1996, 250,000 SEAT Alhambra. In the year 2009, the total annual retail sales number of SEAT Alhambra cars was 6,215 vehicles. The total production per year of Alhambras is shown below:

References

External links

SEAT Alhambra official website

Alhambra
Minivans
Cars of Portugal
Front-wheel-drive vehicles
Euro NCAP large MPVs
Cars introduced in 1996
2000s cars
2010s cars
2020s cars
Cars powered by VR engines